Walter Bagenal may refer to:
 Lord Walter Bagenal  (1670–1745), founded the town of Bagenalstown on the River Barrow
 Walter Bagenal (1762–1814) Irish politician, MP for Carlow 1802–16